William Ray Norwood Jr. (born January 17, 1981), known  professionally as Ray J, is an American singer, actor, and television personality. Born in McComb, Mississippi, and raised in Carson, California, he is the younger brother of recording artist and actress Brandy Norwood and the first cousin of rapper Snoop Dogg. In January 2017, he competed in the nineteenth season of the UK reality television programme Celebrity Big Brother.

Early life
William Ray Norwood Jr. was born in McComb, Mississippi to Willie Norwood and Sonja Bates-Norwood. His older sister Brandy is a multi-platinum recording artist. Early in his life, he moved with his family from McComb, Mississippi to Los Angeles, California, and in 1989 started appearing in television commercials for different companies. In 1989, at the age of eight, Norwood began auditioning for and appearing in television commercials; he played the foster son in The Sinbad Show, from 1993 to 1994. This period in Norwood's life would shape his acting career. According to Bradley Torreano of AllMusic, "his easygoing image and boyish looks appealed to the producers of Brandy's television show, Moesha, giving him a role on the UPN series as Dorian "D-Money", a role he played from 1999 until the show ended in 2001.

Career

1995–2006: Everything You Want, This Ain't a Game, and Raydiation
He signed to Elektra Records in 1995 and he began to record his debut album Everything You Want the same year. The album, released in March 1997, spawned the lead single "Let It Go", which appeared on the Set It Off soundtrack. "Let It Go" peaked at number 25 in the U.S. and number 11 in New Zealand. The second single peaked at number 54 on the U.S. R&B chart. In 1997, he was dropped from the label. In 1998, he appeared on the Dr. Dolittle soundtrack with the single "That's Why I Lie". He produced for toy company Mattel, putting together the music for several commercials and a few of the demos for his second record.

Ray J recorded "Another Day in Paradise" with Brandy, which was a Top Ten success in Austria, UK, Germany, Sweden, Switzerland, Belgium, Norway, Ireland, the Netherlands and number 11 in Australia and France. The song was the lead single of the R&B/Hip Hop tribute Urban Renewal, in which he co-produced and performed songs. Norwood also worked with the Neptunes, Rodney Jerkins and Lil' Kim, and several other producers and singers for his second studio album This Ain't A Game. The album was recorded over 18 months, and was released on June 26, 2001, with Atlantic Records. The lead single "Wait A Minute" peaked at #30 on the U.S. Billboard Hot 100 chart and #8 on the Hot R&B/Hip-Hop Songs chart. "Formal Invite" followed at #54 on the R&B chart.

After a two-year break, Norwood returned to recording studios, adding the finishing touches on his third studio album Raydiation with help from producers such as Rodney Jerkins, Timbaland, R. Kelly, and Rob Egerton. A joint venture by Sanctuary Records and Ray-J's own label, independent Knockout Entertainment, the album was finally released on September 27, 2005, in North America after several delays, debuting at number forty-eight on the Billboard 200 chart, selling 18,321 copies in the first week. The album's lead single "One Wish" was a top 20 success in the US, UK, Ireland, and New Zealand. Raydiation eventually sold over 400,000 copies domestically.

In 2005, Norwood joined the cast of UPN's One On One, where he played the character D-Mack for the final season. On both shows, Ray's character was related to Brandy's (cousin/half-brother on Moesha, brother on One on One).

2007–11: Sex tape, All I Feel, and A Family Business
In February 2007, a pornographic home video he made with former girlfriend Kim Kardashian in 2003, Kim Kardashian, Superstar, was made public. Kardashian sued Vivid Entertainment for ownership of the tape. In late April 2007, Kardashian dropped the suit and settled with Vivid Entertainment for $5 million.

Knockout Entertainment announced a multimillion-dollar album deal with Koch Records and Shaquille O'Neal's "Deja 34" entertainment company. The first album for this deal is Ray J's fourth album All I Feel, which features The Game and Yung Berg among others. It was released on April 1, 2008. The album's first single is "Sexy Can I" featuring rapper Yung Berg peaked at number three on the Top Singles (Hot 100) for six weeks. A video for the track, directed by R. Malcolm Jones, was shot in December 2007. J stars in the Black Christmas movie Dark Christmas under the direction from Deon Taylor.

In 2009, Norwood starred in his own VH1 reality dating show, For the Love of Ray J. The show premiered on February 2, 2009. For his show on March 24, 2009, he released the soundtrack/studio album called For The Love Of Ray J.  On November 2, 2009, the show's second season premiered. In 2010, Norwood and his sister Brandy Norwood premiered the VH1 reality series Brandy and Ray J: A Family Business along with their parents. The show debuted in April 2010 and chronicled the backstage happenings of both siblings, while taking a bigger role in their family's management and production company, R&B Productions.

On June 19, 2011, Ray J, along with his sister Brandy and his father Willie Norwood Sr., released A Family Business, which serves as a soundtrack to their hit reality TV show, Brandy and Ray J: A Family Business, and was released through Time-Life Music.  He released a single from the album called "Turnin' Me On". The song will be featured on his upcoming album as well.

2012: Death of Whitney Houston
On February 11, 2012, Whitney Houston died of "accidental drowning", as ruled by the coroner. Ray J was in San Diego when she died and arrived at the Beverly Hilton, where Houston died, at the time paramedics and police officers came to the scene. While waiting for more information, he became angered upon hearing one of the officers make a "disrespectful comment" about Houston, prompting him to force entry into the suite prior to being restrained. Though he initially did not publicly address her death, Ray J broke his silence on February 17, 2012, when he told US Weekly that while the "world had lost an icon", he had lost a "close friend". Ray J's sister Brandy described him at the time of Houston's death as being "very distraught" and "disconnected" as well as referring to it as "a very hard time in his life."

Ray J and Houston became very close in the last years of her life, leading to speculation of a romantic relationship between the singers. However, Ray J stated that he and Houston were friends, and that they had never dated. On May 21, 2012, Ray J was found in his hotel room, unable to get out of bed and was rushed to a hospital by ambulance. The day before, he was said to have had a confrontation at the 2012 Billboard Music Awards when Whitney Houston's sister-in-law Pat Houston called security on him when she saw Ray J was seated next to Bobbi Kristina Brown, Whitney's daughter. Ray J went to the Beverly Hilton on August 1, 2012, for a panel during the TVOne portion of the 2012 Summer Television Critics Association tour. It was his first time there since Houston's death.

2013–present: Reality TV and new music
Ray J team up with Bobby Brackins for the track "I Hit It First" which was released on April 6, 2013. "I Hit It First" caused controversy for allegedly aiming its lyrics at Kim Kardashian and Kanye West. The song has since debuted at #51 on the Billboard Hot 100. "ATM" was released as a single on August 5, 2014, and it features Migos. Ray J is hosting Oxygen's new reality game show series Bad Girls All-Star Battle. In May 2014, Kardashian and West married. Ray J was reported to have sent a check that totaled his profits off of the sex tape that year as a wedding gift.

He competed with his sister on the FOX reality cooking series My Kitchen Rules.

On January 3, 2017, Ray J took part as a "new star" housemate on season 19 of Celebrity Big Brother. He walked off the show after a week. He also threatened legal action after his exit from the show.

On March 15, 2020, Ray J and Princess Love took part in The Conversation on Zeus Network. In May 2020, Love filed for divorce.

Other ventures

Technology companies  
Raytroniks Inc.
As the founder of Raytroniks, Ray J introduced a line of consumer electronics to the United States market. The product categories included electric bikes, smartphone fans, and smartwatches. In particular, the Scoot-E-Bike brand which Ray J developed grew exponentially after implementing a viral organic marketing strategy. Ray J secured product placements through celebrities such as Sean Combs, Brandy, Snoop Dogg, Chris Brown, Justin Bieber, Stephen Curry, Cara Delevingne, and professional athletic teams, including the L.A. Clippers and Los Angeles Rams.

Raycon Inc.
In November 2017, Ray J co-founded a direct-to-consumer electronics brand called Raycon. Raycon sells wireless audio products such as earbuds and headphones. Ray J oversees brand and strategy.

Personal life
In August 2016, Ray J married Princess Love at Los Angeles' Cathedral of Saint Vibiana. The two star on VH1's Love & Hip Hop: Hollywood. Their daughter, Melody Love, was born on May 22, 2018. Their son, Epik Ray, was born on January 7, 2020. In May 2020, Love filed for divorce.

Politics
He, alongside Kanye West, attended the premiere of conservative commentator Candace Owens's documentary The Greatest Lie Ever Sold, a film investigating Black Lives Matter financial controversy. Owens had been a longstanding supporter of Ray J's allegations against the Kardashians regarding him and Kim's sex tape.

Legal issues
On September 17, 2011, Fabolous tweeted about Ray J playing his song "One Wish" on a piano inside Floyd Mayweather Jr.'s house during a documentary on Mayweather and Victor Ortiz. Ray J confronted Fabolous in Las Vegas just before he was set to take stage at the Palms Casino and is alleged to have punched him in the face. He was arrested following the incident and in an interview with Power 105.1's The Breakfast Club, he explained why he took offense to Fabolous's tweets, stating that he played on the piano "every day" and referred to Mayweather as his "big brother" since the pair grew up together. Ray J demanded an on-air apology from Fabolous and threatened him, stating that he would "smack" him again. A number of celebrities were present during the incident, including 50 Cent, Mayweather and Kevin Hart. Three years later Ray J took full responsibility for the incident. He acknowledged that he had learned from the experience and felt terrible about it as well. According to Ray J, he went through a time of deep depression following the encounter, all the while trying to figure out what led him to act out the way he did and "how can I now grow and be better?"

On May 30, 2014, Ray J was at a bar of the Beverly Wilshire Hotel in Beverly Hills, California when a woman accused him of inappropriately touching her posterior. Police were called and deemed the touching incidental but he was asked to leave by the hotel staff. Ray J became angered because he contends he spent tens of thousands of dollars at the hotel over the last year. At some point, he allegedly became belligerent and according to the police, spat at an officer and kicked out a police car window in the process of being arrested. The charges against him included vandalism, resisting arrest and battery against a police officer. Ray J posted $20,000 bail and was released. The Los Angeles County district attorney on July 21, 2014, filed charges against Ray J and a police spokesman said his initial hearing would take place on July 25.

On July 22, 2014, prosecutors stated the arrest had turned into four criminal charges. He was charged with sexual battery, vandalism of a police car, battery against a police officer and resisting arrest. They claimed he willfully touched the woman's "intimate part" for the "specific purpose of sexual arousal, sexual gratification and sexual abuse." On August 19, Ray J pleaded not guilty to the misdemeanor charges. He was stopped by two police officers on August 6, 2014, in the San Fernando Valley. The officers claimed he was using his cell phone while driving, Ray J insisted that he was struggling to connect his Bluetooth. He was given a warning about texting and driving. The officers reportedly wanted him to step out of his vehicle, which he did, but Ray J claims they simply wanted to take a couple of photographs with him. The LAPD began an internal affairs investigation into the encounter with the two officers.

Discography

Studio albums
 Everything You Want (1997)
 This Ain't a Game (2001)
 Raydiation (2005)
 All I Feel (2008)

Filmography

Film

Television

References

External links
 
 
 Official business website for Raycon Global 

1981 births
Living people
20th-century American male actors
21st-century American male actors
African-American male actors
African-American male rappers
American child singers
American hip hop singers
American male child actors
American male film actors
American male singers
American male television actors
American contemporary R&B singers
Atlantic Records artists
Male actors from California
Male actors from Mississippi
Participants in American reality television series
People from Carson, California
People from McComb, Mississippi
Rappers from Los Angeles
Singers from California
Singers from Mississippi
SRC Records artists
21st-century American rappers
21st-century American male musicians
20th-century African-American people
21st-century African-American musicians